Christian Thompson (born June 14, 1990) is a former American football safety. He played college football at South Carolina State University. He was selected in the fourth round of the 2012 NFL Draft by the Baltimore Ravens.

High school career
He attended St. Thomas Aquinas High School in Fort Lauderdale, Florida.

College career
He played college football at South Carolina State University.

Professional career
Thompson signed a four-year contract with Baltimore Ravens after being drafted in the fourth round of the 2012 NFL Draft with the 130th overall pick.

On April 1, 2013, it was announced that Thompson would be suspended for the first four games of the 2013 season for violating the league's substance abuse policy. The Ravens released Thompson on October 1, 2013.

References

External links
Baltimore Ravens bio
Auburn Tigers bio

1990 births
Living people
Players of American football from Fort Lauderdale, Florida
American football safeties
Auburn Tigers football players
South Carolina State Bulldogs football players
Baltimore Ravens players
People from Melbourne, Florida